Amphiesma is a genus of snakes in the family Colubridae. They are found across Asia.

Species
 Amphiesma stolatum (Linnaeus, 1758) – buff striped keelback
 Amphiesma monticola (Jerdon, 1853) – Wynad keelback

References

Amphiesma
Reptiles of Asia
Snake genera
Taxa named by André Marie Constant Duméril
Taxa named by Gabriel Bibron
Taxa named by Auguste Duméril